Phragmatobia amurensis is a moth in the family Erebidae. It was described by Seitz in 1910. It is found in the Russian Far East (Middle Amur, Primorye, southern Sakhalin, southern Kuril Islands), China (Dunbei, Hebe), Korea and Japan.

Subspecies
Phragmatobia amurensis amurensis
Phragmatobia amurensis japonica Rothschild, 1910 (southern Sakhalin, southern Kuril Islands, Japan)

References

Moths described in 1910
Spilosomina